Leaves of Grass is a poetry collection by American poet Walt Whitman. Though it was first published in 1855, Whitman spent most of his professional life writing and rewriting Leaves of Grass, revising it multiple times until his death. There have been held to be either six or nine individual editions of Leaves of Grass, the count varying depending on how they are distinguished. This resulted in vastly different editions over four decades—the first edition being a small book of twelve poems, and the last, a compilation of over 400. 

The collection of loosely connected poems represents the celebration of his philosophy of life and humanity and praises nature and the individual human's role in it. Rather than focusing on religious or spiritual matters, Leaves of Grass focuses primarily on the body and the material world. With one exception, its poems do not rhyme or follow standard rules for meter and line length.  

Leaves of Grass is regarded by many scholars as a completely do-it-yourself project. Whitman chose his idealized self as the subject of the book, created the style in which it was written (working hard and intelligently to perfect the style over a period of six or seven years), and created the personality of the proletarian bard—the supposed writer of the poems. 

Leaves of Grass is also notable for its discussion of delight in sensual pleasures during a time when such candid displays were considered immoral. The book was highly controversial during its time for its explicit sexual imagery, and Whitman was subject to derision by many contemporary critics. Over time, however, the collection has infiltrated popular culture and became recognized as one of the central works of American poetry.

Among the works in this collection are "Song of Myself", "I Sing the Body Electric", and "Out of the Cradle Endlessly Rocking". Later editions would include Whitman's elegy to the assassinated President Abraham Lincoln, "When Lilacs Last in the Dooryard Bloom'd".

Publication history and origin

Initial publication, 1855 
The first edition of Leaves of Grass was published on July 4, 1855. The poem has its beginnings in an essay by Ralph Waldo Emerson called "The Poet" (1844), which expressed the need for the United States to have its own new and unique poet to write about the new country's virtues and vices. This concept, along with the call to abandon strict rhyme and meter, were explored more fully in earlier works by John Neal: novels Randolph (1823) and Rachel Dyer (1828). Whitman, likely having read all three, consciously set out to answer their call. He thus began working on the first edition of Leaves of Grass. Whitman later commented on Emerson's influence, stating, "I was simmering, simmering, simmering; Emerson brought me to a boil."

On May 15, 1855, Whitman registered the title Leaves of Grass with the clerk of the United States District Court, Southern District of New Jersey, and received its copyright.  The title is a pun, as grass was a term given by publishers to works of minor value, and leaves is another name for the pages on which they were printed. The first edition was published in Brooklyn at the printing shop of two Scottish immigrants, James and Andrew Rome, whom Whitman had known since the 1840s. The shop was located at Fulton Street (now Cadman Plaza West) and Cranberry Street, now the site of apartment buildings that bear Whitman's name. Whitman paid for and did much of the typesetting for the first edition himself. 

A calculated feature of the first edition was that the book included neither the author nor the publisher's name (both the author and publisher being Whitman). Instead, the cover included an engraving by Samuel Hollyer depicting Whitman himself—in work clothes and a jaunty hat, arms at his side. This figure was meant to represent the devil-may-care American working man of the time, one who might be taken as an almost idealized figure in any crowd. The engraver, later commenting on his depiction, described the character with "a rakish kind of slant, like the mast of a schooner". 

The first edition contained no table of contents, and none of the poems had a title. Early advertisements appealed to "lovers of literary curiosities" as an oddity. Sales of the book were few, but Whitman was not discouraged.

One paper-bound copy was sent to Emerson, who had initially inspired its creation. Emerson responded with a letter of heartfelt thanks, writing, "I find it the most extraordinary piece of wit and wisdom America has yet contributed." He went on, "I am very happy in reading it, as great power makes us happy." The letter was printed in the New York Tribune—without the writer's permission—and caused an uproar among prominent New England men of letters, including Henry David Thoreau and Amos Bronson Alcott, who were some of the few Transcendentalists who agreed with Emerson's letter and his statements regarding Leaves of Grass.

The first edition was very small and collected only twelve unnamed poems in 95 pages. Whitman once said he intended the book to be small enough to be carried in a pocket. "That would tend to induce people to take me along with them and read me in the open air: I am nearly always successful with the reader in the open air", he explained. About 800 copies were printed, though only 200 were bound in its trademark green cloth cover. The only American library known to have purchased a copy of the first edition was in Philadelphia. The poems of the first edition, which were given titles in later issues, included:
 "Song of Myself"
 "A Song for Occupations"
 "To Think of Time"
 "The Sleepers"
 "I Sing the Body Electric"
 "Faces"
 "Song of the Answerer"
 "Europe: The 72d and 73d Years of These States"
 "A Boston Ballad"
 "There Was a Child Went Forth"
 "Who Learns My Lesson Complete?" and
 "Great Are the Myths"

Republications, 1856–1889 

There have been held to be either six or nine editions of Leaves of Grass, the count depending on how they are distinguished: scholars who hold that an edition is an entirely new set of type will count the 1855, 1856, 1860, 1867, 1871–72, and 1881 printings; whereas others will include the 1876, 1888–1889, and 1891–1892 (the "deathbed edition") releases.

The editions were of varying length, each one larger and augmented from the previous version—the final edition reached over 400 poems. The first 1855 edition is particularly notable for its inclusion of the poems "Song of Myself" and "The Sleepers".

1856–1860 
It was Emerson's positive response to the first edition that inspired Whitman to quickly produce a much-expanded second edition in 1856. This new edition contained 384 pages and had a cover price of one dollar. It also included a phrase from Emerson's letter, printed in gold leaf: "I Greet You at the Beginning of a Great Career." Recognized as a "first" for U.S. book publishing and marketing techniques, Whitman has been cited as "inventing" the use of the book blurb. Laura Dassow Walls, Professor of English at the University of Notre Dame, noted, "In one stroke, Whitman had given birth to the modern cover blurb, quite without Emerson's permission." Emerson later took offense that this letter was made public and became more critical of his work. This edition included "Crossing Brooklyn Ferry"—a notable poem.

The publishers of the 1860 edition, Thayer and Eldridge, declared bankruptcy shortly after its publication, and were almost unable to pay Whitman. "In regard to money matters," they wrote, "we are very short ourselves and it is quite impossible to send the sum." Whitman received only $250, and the original plates made their way to Boston publisher Horace Wentworth. When the 456-page book was finally issued, Whitman said, "It is quite 'odd', of course," referring to its appearance: it was bound in orange cloth with symbols like a rising sun with nine spokes of light and a butterfly perched on a hand. Whitman claimed that the butterfly was real in order to foster his image as being "one with nature." In fact, the butterfly was made of cloth and was attached to his finger with wire. The major poems added to this edition were "A Word Out of the Sea" and "As I Ebb'd With the Ocean of Life".

1867–1889 
The 1867 edition was intended to be, according to Whitman, "a new & much better edition of Leaves of Grass complete — that unkillable work!" He assumed it would be the final edition. The edition, which included the Drum-Taps section, its Sequel, and the new Songs before Parting, was delayed when the binder went bankrupt and its distributing firm failed. When it was finally printed, it was a simple edition and the first to omit a picture of the poet.

In 1879, Richard Worthington purchased the electrotype plates and began printing and marketing unauthorized copies.

The 1889 (eighth) edition was little changed from the 1881 version, but it was more embellished and featured several portraits of Whitman. The biggest change was the addition of an "Annex" of miscellaneous additional poems.

Sections
By its later editions, Leaves of Grass had grown to 14 sections.
 Inscriptions 
 Children of Adam
 Calamus
 Birds of Passage
 Sea-Drift
 By the Roadside 
 Drum-Taps

 Memories of President Lincoln
 Autumn Rivulets
 Whispers of Heavenly Death
 From Noon to Starry Night
 Songs of Parting
 First Annex: Sands at Seventy 
 Second Annex: Good-bye My Fancy

Earlier editions contained a section called "Chants Democratic"; later editions omitted some of the poems from this section, publishing others in Calamus and other sections.

Deathbed edition, 1892 
As 1891 came to a close, Whitman prepared a final edition of Leaves of Grass, writing to a friend upon its completion, "L. of G. at last complete — after 33 y'rs of hackling at it, all times & moods of my life, fair weather & foul, all parts of the land, and peace & war, young & old." This last version of Leaves of Grass was published in 1892 and is referred to as the deathbed edition. In January 1892, two months before Whitman's death, an announcement was published in the New York Herald:

Walt Whitman wishes respectfully to notify the public that the book Leaves of Grass, which he has been working on at great intervals and partially issued for the past thirty-five or forty years, is now completed, so to call it, and he would like this new 1892 edition to absolutely supersede all previous ones. Faulty as it is, he decides it as by far his special and entire self-chosen poetic utterance.

By the time this last edition was completed, Leaves of Grass had grown from a small book of 12 poems to a hefty tome of almost 400 poems. As the volume changed, so did the pictures that Whitman used to illustrate them—the last edition depicts an older Whitman with a full beard and jacket.

Analysis
Whitman's collection of poems in Leaves of Grass is usually interpreted according to the individual poems contained within its individual editions. Discussion is often focused upon the major editions typically associated with the early respective versions of 1855 and 1856, to the 1860 edition, and finally to editions late into Whitman's life. These latter editions would include the poem "When Lilacs Last in the Dooryard Bloom'd", Whitman's elegy to Abraham Lincoln after his death.

While Whitman has famously proclaimed (in "Song of Myself") his poetry to be "Nature without check with original energy", scholars have discovered that Whitman borrowed from a number of sources for his Leaves of Grass. For his Drum-Taps, for instance, he lifted phrases from popular newspapers dealing with Civil War battles. He also condensed a chapter from a popular science book into his poem "The World Below the Brine".

In a constantly changing culture, Whitman's literature has an element of timelessness that appeals to the American notion of democracy and equality, producing the same experience and feelings within people living centuries apart. Originally written at a time of significant urbanization in America, Leaves of Grass also responds to the impact such has on the masses. The title metaphor of grass, however, indicates a pastoral vision of rural idealism.

Particularly in "Song of Myself", Whitman emphasizes an all-powerful "I" who serves as narrator. The "I" attempts to relieve both social and private problems by using powerful affirmative cultural images; the emphasis on American culture in particular helped reach Whitman's intention of creating a distinctly American epic poem comparable to the works of Homer.

As a believer in phrenology, Whitman, in the 1855 preface to Leaves of Grass, includes the phrenologist among those he describes as "the lawgivers of poets." Borrowing from the discipline, Whitman uses the phrenological concept of adhesiveness in reference to one's propensity for friendship and camaraderie.

Thematic changes 
Whitman edited, revised, and republished Leaves of Grass many times before his death, and over the years
his focus and ideas were not static. One critic has identified three major "thematic drifts" in Leaves of Grass: the period from 1855 to 1859, from 1859 to 1865, and from 1866 to his death.

In the first period, 1855 to 1859, his major work is "Song of Myself", which exemplifies his prevailing love for freedom. "Freedom in 
nature, nature which is perfect in time and place and freedom in expression, leading to the expression of love in its sensuous form." The second period, from 1859 to 1865, paints the picture of a more melancholic, sober poet. In poems like "Out of the Cradle Endlessly Rocking" and "When Lilacs Last in the Dooryard Bloom'd", the prevailing themes are of love and of death.

From 1866 to his death, the ideas Whitman presented in his second period had experienced an evolution: his focus on death had grown to a focus on immortality, the major theme of this period. Whitman became more conservative in his old age, and had come to believe that the importance of law exceeded the importance of freedom. His materialistic view of the world became far more spiritual, believing that life had no meaning outside of the context of God's plan.

Critical response and controversy

When the book was first published, Walt Whitman was fired from his job at the Department of the Interior, after Secretary of the Interior James Harlan read it and said he found it offensive. An early review of the first publication focused on the persona of the anonymous poet, calling him a loafer "with a certain air of mild defiance, and an expression of pensive insolence on his face." Another reviewer viewed the work as an odd attempt at reviving old Transcendental thoughts, "the speculations of that school of thought which culminated at Boston fifteen or eighteen years ago." Emerson approved of the work in part because he considered it a means of reviving Transcendentalism, though even he urged Whitman to tone down the sexual imagery in 1860.

Poet John Greenleaf Whittier was said to have thrown his 1855 edition into the fire. Thomas Wentworth Higginson wrote, "It is no discredit to Walt Whitman that he wrote Leaves of Grass, only that he did not burn it afterwards." The Saturday Press printed a thrashing review that advised its author to commit suicide.

Critic Rufus Wilmot Griswold reviewed Leaves of Grass in the November 10, 1855, issue of The Criterion, calling it "a mass of stupid filth," and categorized its author as a filthy free lover. Griswold also suggested, in Latin, that Whitman was guilty of "that horrible sin not to be mentioned among Christians," one of the earliest public accusations of Whitman's homosexuality. Griswold's intensely negative review almost caused the publication of the second edition to be suspended. Whitman incorporated the full review, including the innuendo, in a later edition of Leaves of Grass.

Not all responses were negative, however. Critic William Michael Rossetti considered Leaves of Grass a classic along the lines of the works of William Shakespeare and Dante Alighieri. A woman from Connecticut named Susan Garnet Smith wrote to Whitman to profess her love for him after reading Leaves of Grass and even offered him her womb should he want a child. Although he found much of the language "reckless and indecent," critic and editor George Ripley believed "isolated portions" of Leaves of Grass radiated "vigor and quaint beauty."

Whitman firmly believed he would be accepted and embraced by the populace, especially the working class. Years later, he regretted not having toured the country to deliver his poetry directly by lecturing:If I had gone directly to the people, read my poems, faced the crowds, got into immediate touch with Tom, Dick, and Harry instead of waiting to be interpreted, I'd have had my audience at once.

1882 
On March 1, 1882, Boston district attorney Oliver Stevens wrote to Whitman's publisher, James R. Osgood, that Leaves of Grass constituted "obscene literature." Urged by the New England Society for the Suppression of Vice, his letter said: We are of the opinion that this book is such a book as brings it within the provisions of the Public Statutes respecting obscene literature and suggest the propriety of withdrawing the same from circulation and suppressing the editions thereof.Stevens demanded the removal of the poems "A Woman Waits for Me" and "To a Common Prostitute", as well as changes to "Song of Myself", "From Pent-Up Aching Rivers", "I Sing the Body Electric", "Spontaneous Me", "Native Moments", "The Dalliance of the Eagles", "By Blue Ontario's Shore", "Unfolded Out of the Folds", "The Sleepers", and "Faces".

Whitman rejected the censorship, writing to Osgood, "The list whole & several is rejected by me, & will not be thought of under any circumstances." Osgood refused to republish the book and returned the plates to Whitman when suggested changes and deletions were ignored. The poet found a new publisher, Rees Welsh & Company, which released a new edition of the book in 1882. Whitman believed the controversy would increase sales, which proved true. Its banning in Boston, for example, became a major scandal and it generated much publicity for Whitman and his work. Though it was also banned by retailers like Wanamaker's in Philadelphia, this version went through five editions of 1,000 copies each. Its first printing, released on July 18, sold out in a day.

Legacy

Its status as one of the more important collections of American poetry has meant that over time various groups and movements have used Leaves of Grass, and Whitman's work in general, to advance their own political and social purposes. For example:

 In the first half of the 20th century, the popular Little Blue Book series introduced Whitman's work to a wider audience than ever before. A series that backed socialist and progressive viewpoints, the publication connected the poet's focus on the common man to the empowerment of the working class.
 During World War II, the American government distributed for free much of Whitman's poetry to their soldiers, in the belief that his celebrations of the American Way would inspire the people tasked with protecting it. 
 Whitman's work has been claimed in the name of racial equality. In a preface to the 1946 anthology I Hear the People Singing: Selected Poems of Walt Whitman, Langston Hughes wrote that Whitman's "all-embracing words lock arms with workers and farmers, Negroes and whites, Asiatics and Europeans, serfs, and free men, beaming democracy to all."
 Similarly, a 1970 volume of Whitman's poetry published by the United States Information Agency describes Whitman as a man who will "mix indiscriminately" with the people. The volume, which was presented for an international audience, attempted to present Whitman as representative of an America that accepts people of all groups.

Nevertheless, Whitman has been criticized for the nationalism expressed in Leaves of Grass and other works. In a 2009 essay regarding Whitman's nationalism in the first edition, Nathanael O'Reilly claims that "Whitman's imagined America is arrogant, expansionist, hierarchical, racist and exclusive; such an America is unacceptable to Native Americans, African-Americans, immigrants, the disabled, the infertile, and all those who value equal rights."

In popular culture

Film and television 
 "The Untold Want" features prominently in the Academy Award-winning 1942 film Now, Voyager, starring Claude Rains, Bette Davis, and Paul Henreid.
 Dead Poets Society (1989) makes repeated references to the poem "O Captain! My Captain!", along with other references to Whitman.
 Leaves of Grass plays a prominent role in the American television series Breaking Bad. Episode eight of season five ("Gliding Over All", after poem 271 of Leaves of Grass) pulls together many of the series' references to Leaves of Grass, such as the fact that Walter White has the same initials as Walt Whitman (as noted in episode four of season four, "Bullet Points", and made more salient in "Gliding Over All"), that leads Hank Schrader to realize Walt is Heisenberg. Numerous reviewers have analyzed and discussed the various connections among Walt Whitman/Leaves of Grass/"Gliding Over All", Walt, and the show.
 In Peace, Love & Misunderstanding (2011), Leaves of Grass is read by Jane Fonda and Elizabeth Olsen's characters.
 In season 3, episode 8 of the BYUtv series Granite Flats, Timothy gives Madeline a first-edition copy of Leaves of Grass as a Christmas gift.
 American singer Lana Del Rey quotes some verses from Whitman's "I Sing the Body Electric" in her short film Tropico (2013).
 In season 1, episode 3 of Ratched (2020) Lily Cartwright is seen reading Leaves of Grass while on psychiatric admission for "sodomy".
 In Bull Durham (1988), Susan Sarandon's character Annie Savoy reads Tim Robbins's character, Ebby Calvin "Nuke" Laloosh, excerpts from Whitman's "I Sing the Body Electric."  When Nuke asks Annie who Walt Whitman plays for, she responds "He sort of pitches for the Cosmic All-Stars".
 In season 3, episode 5 of Dr. Quinn, Medicine Woman, Joe Lando's character, Byron Sully, reads an excerpt from Section 22 of "Song of Myself" to Dr. Mike.  She becomes uneasy at the innuendos suggested in the poem.

Literature 
 "I Sing the Body Electric" was used by author Ray Bradbury as the title of both a 1969 short story and the book it appeared in (I Sing the Body Electric!), after first appearing as the title of an episode Bradbury wrote in 1962 for The Twilight Zone (I Sing the Body Electric).
 Leaves of Grass features prominently in Lauren Gunderson's American Theatre Critics Association award-winning play I and You (2013).
 Roger Zelazny's 1979 time-travel novel Roadmarks features a cybernetically-enhanced edition of Leaves of Grass, one of two such in the story, that acts as a side character giving the protagonist advice and quoting the original. The other "book" is Baudelaire's Les Fleurs du Mal.
 Leaves of Grass appears in John Green's 2008 novel Paper Towns, in which the poem "Song of Myself" plays a particularly noteworthy role in the plot.

Music 
 "A Sea Symphony" (Symphony No.1) by Ralph Vaughan Williams contains text from Leaves of Grass, written between 1903 and 1909.
I Sing the Body Electric (1972) is the second album released by Weather Report.
Leaves of Grass: A Choral Symphony was composed by Robert Strassburg in 1992.
 American singer Lana Del Rey references Walt Whitman and Leaves of Grass in her song "Body Electric", from her EP Paradise (2012).
"Drei Hymnen Von Walt Whitman" (1919) by Paul Hindemith uses translated German text from "Ages and ages, returning at intervals"; "When Lilacs Last in the Dooryard Bloom'd"; "Beat! Beat! Drums!"

References

Bibliography

External links

 
 
 
 
 
  Fan site.

1855 books
1855 poems
American poetry collections
Works published anonymously
Poetry by Walt Whitman
Obscenity controversies in literature
Self-published books
LGBT poetry
LGBT-related controversies in literature
LGBT literature in the United States